CSA Steaua București is a professional Romanian rugby union club from Ghencea, south-west Bucharest, which plays in the Liga Națională de Rugby, the first division of Romanian rugby. They are the most successful rugby union team in the Romania with 24 championship titles and 15 cup titles to their name. Steaua București`s annual operating budget for the 2020-21 season is approximately 925,000 Euros.

History
The Steaua București rugby club was founded in 1948, under the wing of the CSA Steaua București sports club that had been founded by the Romanian Army the previous year, and had traditionally consisted of members drawn from ranks of the army, hence their nickname, the military men.

Steaua established crosstown rivalries with Dinamo București and Grivița Roșie București before winning the team's first Romanian Cup in 1950. The team won the league and cup double in 1953, and by the late 1950s, Steaua was winning domestic titles with regularity. Over the years, the team has also claimed success at the European Championships, winning two European Cups.

Over the years, Steaua București has produced several players that have represented the Romanian national rugby team including Daniel Barbu, Marin Ionescu, Alexandru Penciu, Rene Chiriac, Paul Ciobănel, Adrian Mateescu, Mircea Braga, and Răducu Durbac.

Honours

Domestic
Liga Națională de Rugby:
Winners (24) (record): 1949, 1953, 1954, 1961, 1963, 1964, 1971, 1973, 1974, 1977, 1979, 1980, 1981, 1983, 1984, 1985, 1987, 1988, 1989, 1992, 1999, 2003, 2005, 2006
Runners-up (13): 1955, 1956, 1960, 2002, 2004, 2007, 2008, 2009, 2010, 2011, 2018–19, 2021, 2022
Liga Națională de Rugby: (in 7 players)Winners (13) (record)Cupa României Winners (16) (record): 1950, 1952, 1953, 1955, 1956, 1958, 1974, 1977, 1978, 2005, 2006, 2007, 2009, 2013, 2019, 2022Runners-up (5): 1954, 2008, 2010, 2012, 2015Cupa Regelui: Runners-up (2): 2016, 2018

EuropeanFIRA European CupWinners (2):''' 1966, 1973

Current squad

See also
 Rugby union in Romania

References

External links
 Official website 
 SuperLiga Squad Details 
 itsrugby.co.uk Squad Details 

Rugby Union
Romanian rugby union teams
Rugby clubs established in 1948
1948 establishments in Romania